Martin Arash Momtahan (born March 31, 1989) is an American politician who has served in the Georgia House of Representatives from the 17th district since 2019.

References

Living people
Republican Party members of the Georgia House of Representatives
21st-century American politicians
1989 births